"I Like Music" is a 2008 single by the Irish musical ensemble Republic of Loose. It features on the album Vol IV: Johnny Pyro and the Dance of Evil, being the first single released from it. The band performed it on The Once a Week Show on 5 April 2008.

The Irish Independents John Meagher, after witnessing a performance in April 2008, singled out "I Like Music" along with "23 Things I Don't Like" as songs likely to match or exceed tracks from their previous album.

References

External links
 Music video

2008 singles
Irish rock songs
2008 songs
Song articles with missing songwriters